Feliz is a municipality (município) in the Brazilian state of Rio Grande do Sul. (Municipalities, in this case, are sections of cities/villages in Brazil, which are like counties in the United States of America.) The population of Feliz was 13,640 as of 2020. Feliz was founded in February 1959. Feliz is in the Brazilian region of Sul, which is the southernmost region of Brazil.

References

Municipalities in Rio Grande do Sul